John Strada (born November 13, 1952) is a former American football tight end. He played for the New York Giants and Kansas City Chiefs in 1974.

References

1952 births
Living people
American football tight ends
William Jewell Cardinals football players
New York Giants players
Kansas City Chiefs players